Naval Medical Center Camp Lejeune is a Defense Health Agency facility that is located on Marine Corps Base Camp Lejeune in North Carolina, USA.

Residing on one of the largest military installations on the East Coast, the hospital serves more than 150,000 active-duty military personnel, retirees, and family members alike.

Notes

References
Naval Hospital Camp Lejeune Official Web Page
Naval Hospital Camp Lejeune Official YouTube Page
Naval Hospital Camp Lejeune Official DVIDS Page

Hospital buildings completed in 1943
Hospitals in North Carolina
Buildings and structures in Onslow County, North Carolina
Medical installations of the United States Navy
United States Marine Corps installations
Military hospitals in the United States
Hospitals established in 1943
Trauma centers